Chichkeh may refer to:

Archi, Kunduz Province, Afghanistan
Chichkeh, Takhr, Afghanistan